Hans Schachinger was an Austrian sailor. He competed in the Star event at the 1948 Summer Olympics.

References

External links
 

Year of birth missing
Year of death missing
Austrian male sailors (sport)
Olympic sailors of Austria
Sailors at the 1948 Summer Olympics – Star
Place of birth missing